Tan Tao-liang (Tan Dao-liang; born 22 December 1947) is a Chinese Korean martial artist and former film actor. He has used numerous pseudonyms throughout his career, most frequently Delon Tam, Dorian Tan Tao-liang, Tan Tao-liang, Delon Tan, Dorian Tan, and Delon Tanners. Noted for his leg holding and hopping skills, Tan was nicknamed "Flash Legs".

In his later life, Tan dedicated his time to teaching martial arts, notably to Yuen Biao, Ke Huy Quan of The Goonies, and Shannon Lee, the daughter of the late Bruce Lee.

Early life
Tan was born on December 22, 1947, in Pusan, South Korea. He is a Chinese Korean whose parents fled mainland China after the Second Sino-Japanese War broke out. At age 7, Tan began studying several martial arts including taekwondo, judo, hapkido and kung fu. Of these styles, he favored taekwondo as it "allowed for full contact, sparring and competition." In an interview, he said he liked high kicks because in taekwondo scoring, a kick to the head is worth two points. Tan won many championships as well as a world title.

At age 23, Tan began teaching taekwondo at the National Taiwan University. He went on to teach martial arts actor John Liu.

Career
In 1973, Tan's fighting style was noticed by filmmakers and he was asked to appear in the film The Hero of Chiu Chow. After the film's release, he continued to star in kungfu films while spending most of his time teaching martial arts. 1976 was when Tan reached breakthrough success by starring in John Woo's Hand of Death, which also featured early performances by Jackie Chan, Sammo Hung and Yuen Biao.

After completing Last Breath in 1984, Tan retired from acting and moved to Monterey Park, California, where he opened a martial arts school in 1987 under the name Delon Tan. He eventually relocated to Taiwan, and later returned to the film industry with the 1991 movie Breathing Fire, serving as executive producer using the pseudonym Delon Tanner. The plot was based on a story he wrote that was similar to his 1977 film The Flash Legs.

Tan was arrested in 2006 in Taiwan for beating up five members of staff at a restaurant.

Filmography

References

External links
 
 

1947 births
Cantonese people
Hong Kong male film actors
20th-century Hong Kong male actors
Hong Kong film producers
Hong Kong kung fu practitioners
Hong Kong hapkido practitioners
Hong Kong screenwriters
Living people
People from Busan
South Korean people of Chinese descent